Tiago José Geralnik (born 31 March 2003) is an Argentine footballer who plays as an attacking midfielder for Villarreal CF B.

Club career
Born in Rosario, Santa Fe Province, Geralnik joined River Plate's youth setup in January 2018, from Asociación Deportiva Infantil Unión Rosario (ADIUR). On 16 January 2020, aged just 16, he moved abroad and joined Spanish club Villarreal CF.

Geralnik made his senior debut with the C-team on 5 September 2021, coming on as a late substitute in a 1–0 Tercera División RFEF away win over Callosa Deportiva CF. He scored his first goal fourteen days later, netting the opener in a 2–1 away loss against Silla CF, and finished the season with six goals in 29 appearances; he also featured in 29 minutes with the reserves in a 2–1 loss at Algeciras CF.

Ahead of the 2022–23 campaign, Geralnik was definitely promoted to the B-team in Segunda División. He made his professional debut on 24 September, replacing Rodri late into a 1–1 away draw against Málaga CF.

On 17 January 2023, Geralnik renewed his contract with the Yellow Submarine until 2026.

International career
Geralnik represented Argentina at under-16 and under-20 levels before being called up to the full side by manager Lionel Scaloni for the remaining 2022 FIFA World Cup qualifiers against Venezuela and Ecuador.

References

External links

2003 births
Living people
Argentine people of Italian descent
Argentine people of Ukrainian descent
Sportspeople from Rosario, Santa Fe
Argentine footballers
Association football midfielders
Segunda División players
Primera Federación players
Tercera Federación players
Villarreal CF C players
Villarreal CF B players
Argentina youth international footballers